Judith M. Aronson (born June 7, 1964) is an American actress who has appeared in many films and television shows.

Career
She played Sara Duncan on the short-lived series Pursuit of Happiness (1987–88).

Aronson was born in Los Angeles, California, in 1964. Her first film role was in the 1984 horror film Friday the 13th: The Final Chapter as Samantha. In 1985, she appeared in the hit comedy movie Weird Science as Hilly and in the action movie American Ninja. Other than short films, she has not appeared in film or television since the 2005 film Kiss Kiss Bang Bang.

Aronson has made numerous guest appearances on such television shows as Sledge Hammer!, The Powers of Matthew Star, Simon & Simon, Midnight Caller, Full House, Beverly Hills, 90210, Las Vegas, Charles in Charge  and Law & Order: Criminal Intent. She made an appearance in the 1990 music video, "(Can't Live Without Your) Love and Affection", by Nelson.

In addition to her acting career, Aronson is also an entrepreneur. She owned a Curio Shoppe and currently runs Pilates studios in the Los Angeles area.

Filmography

Film

Television

References

External links

1964 births
Living people
American film actresses
American television actresses
Actresses from Los Angeles
21st-century American women